Chelsea Victoria Clinton (born February 27, 1980) is an American writer and global health advocate. She is the only child of former U.S. President Bill Clinton and former U.S. Secretary of State and 2016 presidential candidate Hillary Clinton. She was a special correspondent for NBC News from 2011 to 2014 and now works with the Clinton Foundation and Clinton Global Initiative, including taking a prominent role at the foundation with a seat on its board.

Clinton was born in Little Rock, Arkansas, during her father's first term as governor. She attended public schools there until he was elected president and the family moved to the White House, where she began attending the private Sidwell Friends School. She received an undergraduate degree at Stanford University and later earned master's degrees from University of Oxford  and Columbia University, and a Doctor of Philosophy in international relations from the University of Oxford in 2014. Clinton married investment banker Marc Mezvinsky in 2010. They have a daughter and two sons.

In 2007 and 2008, Clinton campaigned extensively on American college campuses for her mother's Democratic presidential nomination bid and introduced her at the 2008 Democratic National Convention. She assumed a similar role in her mother's 2016 presidential campaign, making more than 200 public appearances as her surrogate and again introducing her at the 2016 Democratic National Convention.

Clinton has authored and co-authored best-selling children's non-fiction books and co-authored a scholarly book for adults on global health policy, as well as articles and opinion pieces published in major media outlets. She has received numerous awards and honors.

Clinton has worked for McKinsey & Company, Avenue Capital Group, and New York University and serves on several boards, including those of the School of American Ballet, Clinton Foundation, Clinton Global Initiative, Common Sense Media, Weill Cornell Medical College, Expedia Group, and IAC/InterActiveCorp.

Early years

Clinton was born in Little Rock, Arkansas, on February 27, 1980, the only child of Hillary and Bill Clinton. Her name was inspired by a visit to the Chelsea neighborhood of London during a Christmas 1978 vacation. Hillary said that upon hearing the 1969 Judy Collins recording of the Joni Mitchell song "Chelsea Morning", Bill remarked, "If we ever have a daughter, her name should be Chelsea."

When Clinton was two years old, she accompanied her parents as they campaigned throughout Arkansas for her father's gubernatorial race. She learned to read and write at a very young age. Clinton claims that she started reading the newspaper by the age of three and also wrote a letter to President Ronald Reagan when she was only five. In the letter, which was photocopied and preserved by her father, she asked President Reagan not to visit a military cemetery in West Germany, which includes graves of Nazi soldiers. Clinton attended Forest Park Elementary School, Booker Arts and Science Magnet Elementary School and Horace Mann Junior High School, both Little Rock public schools. She skipped the third grade.

As a young child, Clinton was raised in her father's Southern Baptist faith, and later attended her mother's United Methodist church.

White House years

On January 20, 1993, the day of her father's first inauguration, Chelsea moved into the White House with her parents and was given the Secret Service codename "Energy". The Clintons wanted their daughter to have a normal childhood, and they hoped to shield her from the media spotlight.

Hillary Clinton followed the advice of Jacqueline Kennedy Onassis on raising children in the White House, and asked the press to limit coverage of Chelsea to her participation in public events such as state visits. Margaret Truman, daughter of former president Harry S. Truman, supported the Clintons, and in March 1993 wrote a letter to the editor of The New York Times about the damage that could be done if the press made Chelsea a subject of intense coverage. 

Following her attendance at Horace Mann Junior High, the Clintons decided to remove Chelsea from public school and send her to Sidwell Friends School, a private school in Washington, D.C. While several children of sitting presidents have attended Sidwell, the most recent prior child, Amy Carter, had gone to D.C. public schools. Although their decision drew some criticism as a perceived rejection of the public school system, Bill defended the decision as an effort to protect Chelsea's privacy and allow her to determine her own future. During her time at the school, Sidwell's students and staff generally declined to discuss Chelsea with the press. A veteran of Model United Nations, Clinton was a 1997 National Merit Scholarship semifinalist. She graduated from Sidwell in 1997; her father spoke at the graduation ceremony. Media speculation regarding her choice of college resulted in heavy press coverage. She ultimately chose to attend Stanford University. 

Throughout her father's time in the White House, journalists debated the issue of allowing Clinton to retain her privacy. Most media outlets concluded that she should be off-limits due to her age, although Rush Limbaugh and Saturday Night Live both broadcast material mocking her appearance. During this phase of her life, her father said, "We really work hard on making sure that Chelsea doesn't let other people define her sense of her own self-worth ... It's tough when you are an adolescent ... but I think she'll be ok." 

In early 1999, the Clintons learned of an article being planned by People that examined Chelsea's relationship with her parents in the wake of the impending vote on President Clinton's impeachment. The Secret Service told the magazine they had concerns that the story could compromise Chelsea's security. People ran the story anyway, and Bill and Hillary issued a statement expressing their disappointment. Carol Wallace, Peoples managing editor, felt that Chelsea, then 19, was "an eyewitness to family drama and historical events" and thus "a valid journalistic subject". The article, entitled "Grace Under Fire", was published in February 1999 with a cover photo of Chelsea and Hillary.

During her father's eight years in office, there were 32 stories in The New York Times and 87 network news stories about Chelsea. One author determined that she had received the most television coverage of all presidential children preceding her, although they noted that only she and Maureen Reagan had a full eight years as presidential children. During the last year of her father's presidency, Chelsea assumed some White House hostess responsibilities when her mother was campaigning for the U.S. Senate, traveling with her father on several overseas trips and attending state dinners with him.

Activities 
Although her father was a Southern Baptist, Clinton was raised in and adheres to her mother's Methodist faith. As a teenager, she attended the youth ministry group at Foundry United Methodist Church in Washington, where her parents sometimes joined her. An adult group leader thought Clinton to be "a terrific kid" and observed that she was treated as an equal in the group.

At age four, Clinton had begun taking dance classes in Arkansas, and she continued her dance training at the Washington School of Ballet for several years. In her book, It Takes a Village, Hillary wrote that Bill was disappointed when Chelsea quit softball and soccer to concentrate on ballet, but he was nonetheless supportive, regularly attending her performances. She was cast in the role of the Favorite Aunt in the 1993 Washington Ballet production of Tchaikovsky's The Nutcracker.

Education and academic life

Stanford University

Clinton entered Stanford University in the fall of 1997 and majored in history.

The week before she arrived on campus, her mother published an open letter in her syndicated column asking journalists to leave her daughter alone. Chelsea arrived at Stanford in a motorcade with her parents, Secret Service agents, and almost 250 journalists. For her security, bullet-proof glass was installed in her dorm windows and surveillance cameras were placed in hallways. Secret Service agents in plain clothes lived in her dorm. With the exception of an occasional tabloid story written about her, Chelsea's four years at Stanford remained out of public view.

Clinton obtained a Bachelor of Arts degree in history, with highest honors, at Stanford in 2001. The topic of her 167-page senior thesis was the 1998 Good Friday Agreement in Northern Ireland, advised by Jack Rakove. At the time of Chelsea's graduation, her father issued a statement: "Hillary and I are grateful for the friendships and great learning experiences Chelsea had at Stanford, and we are very proud of her on this special day."

University of Oxford

Starting in 2001, Chelsea pursued a master's degree at University College of the University of Oxford where her father had studied politics as a Rhodes Scholar. Lord Butler of Brockwell, the Master of University College, said: "Her record at Stanford shows that she is a very well-qualified and able student. The college is also pleased to extend its link with the Clinton family." Upon the recommendation of British and American advisers, the university implemented security measures, and fellow students were asked not to discuss her with the press.

Arriving at Oxford just after the September 11 attacks, Clinton was drawn to other American students who were also feeling the emotional after-effects of the trauma. She told Talk magazine:Every day I encounter some sort of anti-American feeling. Over the summer, I thought I would seek out non-Americans as friends, just for diversity's sake. Now I find that I want to be around Americans—people who I know are thinking about our country as much as I am.

Clinton was criticized for those remarks in the London press and by the newspaper Oxford Student, whose editorial attacking her angered the university. However, people who met Clinton at that time described her as charming, poised and unaffected, as she adjusted successfully to life abroad.

At Oxford University in 2003, Clinton completed a Master of Philosophy degree in international relations. Her 132-page thesis was titled The Global Fund to Fight AIDS, TB and Malaria: A Response to Global Threats, a Part of a Global Future, supervised by Jennifer Welsh and Ngaire Woods. Following her graduation, she returned to the United States.

Further education

In the spring of 2010, Clinton completed a Master of Public Health degree at the Mailman School of Public Health of Columbia University. She began teaching graduate classes there in 2012.

Starting in 2010, Clinton began serving as Assistant Vice-Provost for the Global Network University of New York University, working on international recruitment strategies. She is the co-founder of the Of Many Institute for Multifaith Leadership at NYU and serves as its co-chair. By 2010, she was also pursuing Doctor of Philosophy coursework at New York University's Robert F. Wagner Graduate School of Public Service, and later transferred back to the University of Oxford in 2011 to complete her dissertation.

In 2011, Clinton transferred back to University College, Oxford, from the Wagner School of Public Service at New York University to complete her Doctor of Philosophy degree in International Relations. She stated this was to be under her preferred doctoral advisor, Ngaire Woods. She finished her dissertation in New York City and was awarded the degree in May 2014. Her dissertation was titled The Global Fund: An Experiment in Global Governance.

In 2012, Clinton received an award from interfaith organization Temple of Understanding for her "work in advancing a new model of integrating interfaith and cross-cultural education into campus life", together with Imam Khalid Latif and Rabbi Yehuda Sarna.

Professional life

In 2003, Clinton joined the consulting firm McKinsey & Company in New York City, and she went to work for Avenue Capital Group in late 2006. She served as co-chair for a fund-raising week for the Clinton Foundation, and subsequently became Vice Chair for the foundation. She serves on the board of the School of American Ballet and on IAC's board of directors. In March 2017, Clinton was named to the board of directors of Expedia Group.

In November 2011, NBC hired Clinton as a special correspondent. One of her roles was reporting stories about "Making a Difference" for NBC Nightly News and Rock Center with Brian Williams. It was a three-month contract and allowed her to concurrently continue working for the Clinton Foundation and pursue her education. Clinton's first appearance was on the December 12, 2011, episode of Rock Center. Although she received some critical reviews for her work, Clinton's contract with NBC was renewed in February 2012. Rock Center ended in May 2013, and she left the network in August 2014. Clinton reportedly earned an annual salary of $600,000 for her work at NBC.

Clinton is the author of five children's picture books, two of which were best sellers, and she co-authored a scholarly book about global health policy. She has also written numerous articles and opinion pieces, published in major media outlets, such as CNN, Time magazine, Huffington Post, Refinery 29 and others.

In April 2021, Clinton launched a podcast on iHeartMedia's iHeartPodcast network titled “In Fact with Chelsea Clinton".

Clinton Foundation

Since 2011, Clinton has taken a prominent role at the family's Clinton Foundation, and has had a seat on its board. As part of her work, she gives paid speeches to raise money with her fees going directly to the foundation, whose goals relate to improving global health, creating opportunities for women, and promoting economic growth. A spokesperson for the foundation told The New York Times in 2014 that her speeches "are on behalf of the Clinton Foundation, and 100 percent of the fees are remitted directly to the foundation".

Author

Children's non-fiction
In September 2015, Clinton's first children's book, It's Your World: Get Informed, Get Inspired and Get Going!, was published by Philomel Books. The 400-page book is aimed at middle school students (ages 10 to 14) and introduces them to a range of social issues, encouraging them to take action to make the world a better place. The paperback edition was published by Puffin Books in 2017.

In May 2017, her second children's book, She Persisted: 13 American Women Who Changed the World , illustrated by Alexandra Boiger, was published by Philomel Books. Upon its release, the book became a bestseller, reaching No.1 on The New York Times Children's Picture Books Best Sellers list on July 30, 2017. In 2019, she worked with the Berkeley, California's Bay Area Children's Theater in adapting the book into a musical play, She Persisted: The Musical, which ran from January to March. The book was inspired by the feminist expression and social media phenomenon Nevertheless, she persisted and is written for a young audience of four- to eight-year-olds.

In 2018, Clinton wrote a companion book featuring women around the world, also published by Philomel and illustrated by Boiger, entitled She Persisted Around the World: 13 Women Who Changed History which debuted at No.2 on the Times''' Children's Picture Books Best Sellers list and remained on the list for 40 weeks.

Clinton's fourth children's book, Start Now!: You Can Make a Difference, was published by Philomel in 2018. It is aimed at empowering young would-be activists aged seven to ten, addressing themes ranging from bullying to climate change to endangered species. In interviews, she talked about how she drew on her personal experiences and strategies for dealing with bullies growing up and as an adult.

In 2019, Clinton published her fifth children's book, Don't Let Them Disappear: 12 Endangered Species Across the Globe. The book, illustrated by Gianna Marino, is about endangered animals and is aimed at teaching children aged four to eight about species in need of protection, an interest of hers for 20 years.

Clinton continued her children's "She Persisted" series in 2020 with She Persisted in Sports: American Olympians Who Changed the Game, also published by Philomel.  Again illustrated by Alexandra Boiger, this chapter book celebrates women in sports who broke records and smashed barriers with their persistence.

Co-authored with Hillary Clinton
In 2019, she co-wrote a book with her mother, Hillary Clinton, titled The Book of Gutsy Women: Favorite Stories of Courage and Resilience and they embarked on a multi-city book tour together.

The mother-daughter writing duo followed in 2020 with Grandma's Gardens, a children's book inspired by Hillary's mother Dorothy Rodham, who had a passion for gardening that the authors describe as a loving inter-generational activity.

Scholarly work
Clinton co-authored a highly praised scholarly work on global health policy with Devi Sridhar, entitled Governing Global Health: Who Runs the World and Why?, published in 2017 by Oxford University Press. The book examines the role of partnerships between public and private entities in addressing global health issues.

Political activities
Hillary Clinton 2008 presidential campaign

In December 2007, Clinton began campaigning in Iowa in support of her mother's bid for the Democratic presidential nomination. She appeared across the country, largely on college campuses. By early April 2008, she had spoken at 100 colleges on behalf of her mother's candidacy.

While campaigning, Clinton answered audience questions but did not give interviews or respond to press questions, including one from a nine-year-old Scholastic News reporter asking whether her father would be a good "first man". She replied, "I'm sorry, I don't talk to the press and that applies to you, unfortunately. Even though I think you're cute." Philippe Reines, her mother's press secretary, intervened when the press attempted to approach Chelsea directly.

When MSNBC reporter David Shuster characterized Clinton's participation in her mother's campaign as "sort of being pimped out", the Clinton campaign objected. Shuster subsequently apologized on-air and was suspended for two weeks.

The first time she was asked about her mother's handling of the Clinton–Lewinsky scandal at a campaign stop Clinton responded, "I do not think that is any of your business." As she became a more experienced campaigner, she refined her responses and deflected questions on the issue with comments such as, "If that's what you want to vote on, that's what you should vote on. But I think there are other people [who are] going to vote on things like healthcare and economics."

At the 2008 Democratic National Convention, Chelsea called Hillary "my hero and my mother" and introduced her with a long video tribute.

Hillary Clinton 2016 presidential campaign

As she did in 2008, Clinton again took an active part in her mother's presidential campaign in 2016, expanding her role as surrogate at more than 200 public events across the country, including and beyond college campuses. In July 2016, she introduced her mother at the Democratic National Convention in Philadelphia, in a personal, emotional tribute recalling her own upbringing and describing her mother's commitment to issues and to public service.

Throughout the primary and general election campaigns, Clinton spoke about her mother's lifelong work on behalf of women, families, and children, highlighting her positions on healthcare, affordable college tuition and reduction of student debt, climate change, women's reproductive rights, immigration reform, gun violence, and the importance of voter turnout. Clinton gave birth to her second child during the campaign, five weeks before the convention, and she frequently spoke about motherhood and the issues women face in balancing work and home, including the challenges of breastfeeding.

Even prior to her mother's receiving the nomination, Clinton frequently spoke out against candidate Donald Trump's positions and rhetoric, explaining to reporters in Indianapolis in April that she does so because "I think it's important [for] all of us who feel like Mr. Trump's rhetoric of sexism and racism and Islamophobia and anti-immigrant hatred and stance has no place in our country." Later, at a September general election campaign stop in Arizona, she further said, "I never thought I would see in my lifetime the almost daily diet of hate speech coming out of Donald Trump... that too often goes unanswered and unrepudiated by the Republicans. The racism, the sexism, the Islamophobia, the homophobia, the jingoism, the demeaning rhetoric against Americans with disabilities, the disrespect for our veterans, the disrespect for a Gold Star family"; additionally, she also called his stand against Constitutionally guaranteed birthright citizenship "un-American". At one appearance in September 2016, while answering a question about her mother's position supporting medical marijuana research, Clinton got some attention for an inaccurate comment she made regarding drug interactions with marijuana; she walked back the comment a few days later, acknowledging that she misspoke.

Personal life

On July 31, 2010, Clinton and investment banker Marc Mezvinsky were married in an interfaith ceremony at the Astor Courts estate in Rhinebeck, New York. He is Jewish, but Clinton remained a Methodist and did not convert to Judaism. Mezvinsky's parents are both former members of Congress, Marjorie Margolies-Mezvinsky and Edward Mezvinsky,   who were raised in the Conservative Jewish tradition. The senior Clintons and Mezvinskys were friends in the 1990s and their children met on a Renaissance Weekend retreat in Hilton Head Island, South Carolina. They first were reported to be a couple in 2005, and became engaged over Thanksgiving weekend in 2009.

Following their wedding, the couple lived in New York City's Gramercy Park neighborhood for three years and later purchased a $10.5 million condominium in the NoMad district of Manhattan. Their first child, a daughter named Charlotte, was born on September 26, 2014. Their second child and first son, named Aidan, was born on June 18, 2016. Shortly after Aidan was born, the family moved to the nearby Flatiron District. Their third child and second son, Jasper, was born on July 22, 2019.

In popular culture

Clinton is portrayed in the 1996 film Beavis and Butt-Head Do America, where Butt-Head flirts with her at the White House; she responds by tossing him out a window.

In Zenon: Girl of the 21st Century, a Disney Channel Original Movie set in the year 2049, Clinton is the President of the United States.

In Clarissa Explains It All, the title character (Melissa Joan Hart) repeatedly imagines Clinton becoming President of the United States.

Clinton is the direct inspiration for the 2004 film Chasing Liberty, starring Mandy Moore and Matthew Goode.

In January 2015, Chelsea Clinton appeared in a Sesame Street skit with Elmo, advocating the importance of reading to young children.

Clinton appeared in the final scene of series 3 on the Channel 4 sitcom Derry Girls''.

Awards and recognitions

Clinton has received awards and honors, including:
Children's Defense Fund Children's Champion Award, 2019
Ida. S. Scudder Centennial Woman's Empowerment Award, 2018
BBC's 100 women, 2018
Mother's Day Council Outstanding Mother Award, 2018
BlogHer Voices of the Year Call to Action Award, 2018 
Variety Impact Award, 2017
City Harvest Award for Commitment, 2017
Virginia A. Hodgkinson Research Book Prize, 2017
Glamour Woman of the Year, 2014
Riverkeeper Honoree, 2014
AJC Interfaith Leadership Award, 2014
Harvard School of Public Health Next Generation Award, 2013
Emery S. Hetrick Award, 2013
New York Observer 20 Most Important Philanthropists, 2013

Published works

Books

 (co-author Devi Sridhar)

 (by Bryan Rafanelli, foreword by Chelsea Clinton)
 (co-author Hillary Clinton)
 (co-author Hillary Clinton)

References

External links

1980 births
Living people
20th-century American women
20th-century Baptists
20th-century Methodists
21st-century American businesspeople
21st-century American businesswomen
21st-century American non-fiction writers
21st-century American women writers
21st-century Methodists
Activists from Little Rock, Arkansas
Activists from New York (state)
Alumni of University College, Oxford
American consulting businesspeople
American financial businesspeople
American health activists
American nonprofit businesspeople
American people of Dutch descent
American people of English descent
American people of French-Canadian descent
American people of Irish descent
American people of Scotch-Irish descent
American people of Scottish descent
American people of Welsh descent
American television reporters and correspondents
American United Methodists
American women non-fiction writers
American women television journalists
Arkansas Democrats
BBC 100 Women
Businesspeople from Little Rock, Arkansas
Businesspeople from New York City
Children of presidents of the United States
Daughters of national leaders
Clinton Foundation people
Columbia University faculty
Columbia University Mailman School of Public Health alumni
Family of Bill and Hillary Clinton
Former Baptists
McKinsey & Company people
Mezvinsky family
New York University staff
People from the Flatiron District, Manhattan
People from Gramercy Park
Rodham family
Sidwell Friends School alumni
Stanford University alumni
Robert F. Wagner Graduate School of Public Service alumni